Claude Pierre Marie Dielna (born 14 December 1987) is a French professional footballer who last played as a central defender for Ħamrun Spartans in Malta. He was a great starter player in FIFA ultimate team squads, even leading some elite players to name their team in his honour. Team names such as “Dawn of Dielna” were particularly popular.

Career
Born in Clichy-la-Garenne, Dielna started his career at Caen before moving to Lorient, where he signed his first professional contract in April 2007, which he described as his greatest sporting joy. However, at Lorient, Dielna struggled to make a breakthrough at Lorient and left the club for Istres, signing a one-year contract in the summer of 2008.

Dielna was a first team regular during his time at Istres, making a total of 95 appearances for the Ligue 2 team. He also helped the side win the French national titles during his time there.

Olympiacos
He signed for Olympiacos in late May 2012 as a free agent on a three-year contract. However, Manager Leonardo Jardim placed Dielna on a loan list.

Immediately after joining Olympiacos, Dielna returned to France, where he joined Sedan on a season long loan. Dielna made his debut for the club, days later after joining the club, in a 2-2 draw against Caen. Dielna would go on to make twenty-five appearances and score two goals against Tours and Arles-Avignon for the club.

At the start of the 2013-14 season, Dielna loaned out again to join Ligue 1 side Ajaccio on a season long loan. Dielna went on to make twenty-two appearances for the club, though his spell was overshadowed by claims he fell out with manager Fabrizio Ravanelli. However, at the end of the season, Ajaccio were relegated to Ligue 2 and Dielna announced that he will be returning to Olympiacos. Dielna cited the club's relegation was over injury problems.

Sheffield Wednesday
On 30 August 2014, Dielna signed a three-year deal with English championship side Sheffield Wednesday. Dielna's move to the club was welcomed by Réda Johnson.

Dielna made his debut for the club, where he came on as a substitute for Jacques Maghoma in the last minute, in a 1-0 win over Reading. Then, on 6 December 2014, Dielna scored his first goal for the club after coming on as an 88th-minute substitute and scoring the winner in 93rd minute to win 2-1 over Blackburn Rovers. His good display in the match earned him included Football League Team of the Week for the Championship. Initially out of the first team since joining the club, due to his match fitness and sharpness, Dielna soon established himself in the first team despite facing competitions from Joe Mattock. His performance attracted interests from West Brom and Genoa. Despite this, he continued that run until an injury struck out for the rest of the season. In his first season at Sheffield Wednesday, Dielna made twenty-five appearances and scoring three times in all competitions.

In the 2015-16 season, Dielna, however, found himself out of the first team, due to his own injury concern and was dropped out by new Manager Carlos Carvalhal. With his future at the club uncertain, Dielna was told by the club that he can leave the club on loan. He was subsequently loaned out to Slovan Bratislava for the rest of the season. He made his Slovan Bratislava debut, where he came on as a second-half substitute, in a 1-0 win over Železiarne Podbrezová on 5 March 2016. Dielna went on to make six appearances for the club before returning to his parent club at the end of the season.

In the 2016-17 season, Dielna was placed on a transfer list by Manager Carvalhal upon returning to his parent club. Amid to being placed on the transfer list, Dielna was disciplined by the club for breaching the club's policy on social media and was subsequently suspended. He remained out of the first team throughout the most of the season. After being told by the club that he can leave the club, Dielna joined Romanian side Dinamo București on loan for the rest of the season. He made his debut for club, starting the whole game, in a 2-1 loss against Concordia Chiajna on 13 February 2017. Although he suffered a muscle injury later in the season, Dielna managed to regain his first team since his return and made seventeen appearances for the side.
   
Upon returning to his parent club, Dielna was released by the club at the end of the 2016-17 season.

New England Revolution
After being released by Sheffield Wednesday, Dielna was linked a move to Dinamo București. Instead, Dielna signed with Major League Soccer side New England Revolution on 28 July 2017.

New England released Dielna at the end of their 2018 season.

Career statistics

Personal life
Dielna is a cousin of Ronald Zubar and Stéphane Zubar, who are both professional footballers and also has a Guadeloupe descent. He's good friends with Bakary Sako.

References

External links
 
 
 

1987 births
Living people
French footballers
FC Lorient players
FC Istres players
Olympiacos F.C. players
CS Sedan Ardennes players
AC Ajaccio players
Sheffield Wednesday F.C. players
ŠK Slovan Bratislava players
FC Dinamo București players
New England Revolution players
Portland Timbers players
Portland Timbers 2 players
CS Universitatea Craiova players
Ħamrun Spartans F.C. players
Ligue 1 players
Ligue 2 players
Major League Soccer players
Slovak Super Liga players
Super League Greece players
USL Championship players
Liga I players
Association football defenders
Designated Players (MLS)
English Football League players
Expatriate footballers in England
Expatriate footballers in Greece
Expatriate footballers in Romania
Expatriate footballers in Slovakia
Expatriate soccer players in the United States
Expatriate footballers in Malta
French expatriate footballers
French expatriate sportspeople in England
French expatriate sportspeople in Greece
French expatriate sportspeople in Romania
French expatriate sportspeople in Slovakia
French expatriate sportspeople in the United States
French expatriate sportspeople in Malta
French people of Guadeloupean descent
Sportspeople from Clichy, Hauts-de-Seine
Footballers from Hauts-de-Seine